Dance Without Movement is a dark and comic play by Sophia Rashid. Commissioned by Peshkar Productions, a group that aims to experiment with young British Asian theatre, it is a one-woman piece focused on Zuleikha, a British Asian woman of Pakistani descent who is in the midst of a cultural divide Directed by Jim Johnson (theatre-maker/musician), the play went through two tours: a 2007 one that was local to Oldham and saw Zuleikha played by Poppy Jhakra Poppy Jhakra, actor, Mandy Actors and a residency at the 2008 Edinburgh Festival Fringe which saw Yamina Peerzada take on the role.

Synopsis
Dance without movement is a one-woman play where Zuleikha explores her identity. She has reached adulthood and has been a part of many communities up until now. Her Pakistani background and Muslim faith are at odds with her English upbringing. Amidst a sea of confusion Zuleikha must try to unravel her true identity.

References

Sources 
Sophia on the Fringe of success - News - News and Reviews - Greater Manchester's CityLife
Dance without Movement - Review - Edinburgh Festival guide | Fest

External links
Peshkar's official website
Peshkar's Arts Council profile
Oldham tour dates
Reviews from the 2008 Edinburgh Fringe (52) 

2007 plays
British plays
English plays
Plays for one performer
Plays set in England
Plays about race and ethnicity